is a district located in Kamikawa Subprefecture, Hokkaido, Japan.  There is a district with the same name in Tokachi Subprefecture, see Nakagawa (Tokachi) District, Hokkaido.

As of 2004, the district has an estimated population of 9,038 and a density of 5.86 persons per km2. The total area is 1,542.65 km2.

Towns and villages
Bifuka
Nakagawa
Otoineppu

Districts in Hokkaido